Furqaan Academy is a PreK-12 full day Islamic school located in Bolingbrook, Illinois in the Chicago Metropolitan Area. It is under the Al-Furqaan Foundationand it serves western and southwestern suburbs of Chicago. it was Founded In 2007.There was a branch in Collin County, Texas that was merged into GoodTree Academy.

References

External links
 Furqaan Academy

Bolingbrook, Illinois
Islamic schools in Illinois
Private elementary schools in Illinois
Private middle schools in Illinois
Private high schools in Illinois
Schools in Will County, Illinois